Torralba del Río is a town and municipality in the province and autonomous community of Navarre, northern Spain.

The Santuario de Nuestra Señora de Codés is located within the Torralba del Río municipal term in the Codés Range.

References

External links

 TORRALBA DEL RIO in the Bernardo Estornés Lasa - Auñamendi Encyclopedia (Euskomedia Fundazioa) 

Municipalities in Navarre